Peter Stafford Bellwood (born Leicester, England, 1943) is Emeritus Professor of Archaeology in the School of Archaeology and Anthropology at the Australian National University (ANU) in Canberra. He is well known for his Out of Taiwan model regarding the spread of Austronesian languages.

Education and career 
Peter Bellwood received his BA and PhD from Cambridge University (King's College) in 1966 and 1980 respectively. His areas of specialization include the  human population history of Southeast Asia and the Pacific from archaeological, linguistic and biological perspectives; the worldwide origins of agriculture and resulting cultural, linguistic and biological developments; and the prehistory of human migration. He is  researching with Philip J. Piper and Lam My Dzung on an archaeological fieldwork project, funded by the Australian Research Council, on Neolithic sites in Vietnam.

Professor Bellwood was the Secretary-General of the Indo-Pacific Prehistory Association (1990 to 2009) and was formerly the Editor of the Bulletin of the Indo-Pacific Prehistory Association (now the Journal of Indo-Pacific Archaeology).

His books have been translated into French, Greek, Russian, Chinese, Japanese, Vietnamese and Indonesian. Further translations are in progress into Chinese (Complex and Simplified) and Turkish.

Awards and recognition 
Peter Bellwood is a Fellow of the Australian Academy of the Humanities, a Corresponding Fellow of the British Academy, and an Honorary Fellow of the Associazione Internationale di Studi sul Mediterraneo e l'Oriente (Rome).

In July 2021 Peter Bellwood won the International Cosmos Prize in Osaka, Japan, being the first Australian recipient.

Publications

Books (selected)
Peter Bellwood (2023), First Farmers, second edition, John Wiley & Sons, ISBN 978-1-119-70634-2.
Peter Bellwood (2022), The Five-Million-Year Odyssey, Princeton University Press, ISBN 978-0-691-19757-9. Winner of the 2023 PROSE Award in Biological Anthropology, Archaeology, and Ancient History, Association of American Publishers.
Peter Bellwood (2019), The Spice Islands in Prehistory, ANU Press, ISBN 978-1-760-46290-1.
Peter Bellwood (2017), First Islanders: Prehistory and Human Migration in Island Southeast Asia, Wiley-Blackwell, ISBN 978-1-925-02127-1.
Peter Bellwood, Eusebio Dizon (2013), 4000 Years of Migration and Cultural Exchange, ANU Press, ISBN 978-1-925-02128-8.

Peter Bellwood (2007), Prehistory of the Indo-Malaysian Archipelago, 3rd edition, ANU E-Press, ISBN 9781921313110
 Winner of the Association of American Publishers (Washington D.C.) Award for Excellence in Professional and Scholarly Publishing (Archaeology and Anthropology) for 2006; and winner of a Book Award from the Society for American Archaeology (Washington D.C. 2006).

Peter Bellwood (1997), Prehistory the Indo-Malaysian Archipelago, revised edition, University of Hawaii Press, ISBN 978-0-8248-1907-1.
 

 Revised edition 1987.

See also
 Austronesian Hypothesis
 Demic diffusion – the impact of farming on human migration is a key research interest (see references above)

References

Historians of the Pacific
Australian archaeologists
20th-century Australian historians
Australian anthropologists
Academic staff of the Australian National University
Living people
1943 births
Corresponding Fellows of the British Academy
Fellows of the Australian Academy of the Humanities
21st-century Australian historians